Laura Gallagher (born 26 March 1989) is a British trampoline gymnast.

Her achievements in trampolining include becoming the Under-19 world champion in 2007, winning an individual bronze medal at the 2012 European Championship, a gold medal in the team event at the 2013 Trampoline World Championships, and placing sixth in the individual event at the 2019 World Championships. In 2014, Gallagher suffered a back injury that led to her withdrawing from competition for seven months. 

In June 2021, Gallagher and Bryony Page were selected for the trampoline event at the 2020 Summer Olympics.

She is coached by Susan Bramble.

References

External links
 

1989 births
Living people
British female trampolinists
Gymnasts at the 2015 European Games
European Games competitors for Great Britain
Medalists at the Trampoline Gymnastics World Championships
Gymnasts at the 2020 Summer Olympics
21st-century British women